Events in the year 2014 in Lithuania.

Incumbents
President: Dalia Grybauskaitė
Prime Minister: Algirdas Butkevičius

Events

May
25 May - Lithuania's incumbent President Dalia Grybauskaitė declares victory following a second round of voting in the Baltic country's presidential elections.

November
 10 November - An employee at the Lithuanian state air navigation company was charged with espionage. He was suspected of spying on civilian and military air operations on behalf of Belarus.

Births

Deaths
20 January - Jonas Trinkūnas, Lithuanian ethnologist and academic (born 1939)
9 February - Antanas Račas, politician (born 1940)

References

 
Lithuania
Years of the 21st century in Lithuania
2010s in Lithuania
Lithuania